George D. Ruggles (September 11, 1833 – October 19, 1904) was an officer in the United States Army who served as Adjutant General of the U.S. Army from 1893 to 1897.

Biography
He was born in Newburgh, New York. His parents died when he was young, and he was raised by his uncle, Charles H. Ruggles, who was Chief Justice of the New York Court of Appeals.  He graduated from the United States Military Academy in 1855 and was appointed to the 2nd Infantry, in which he served until the outbreak of the American Civil War.

At the beginning of the war, he served in various staff positions, before becoming a colonel and chief-of-staff of the Army of Virginia under General John Pope, where he saw action in the Battle of Cedar Mountain, the Second Battle of Bull Run, and the Battle of Chantilly.  He later served as assistant chief-of-staff of the Army of the Potomac, being engaged in the battles of South Mountain and Antietam.  In December 1862, he was assigned to staff duty in Washington, D.C.  In February 1865, he was named adjutant general of the Army of the Potomac under General George Meade, and took part in the Battle of Hatcher's Run.

Ruggles remained in the Adjutant General's Department following the end of the war, and from July 1865 through May 1888, served as adjutant general for various departments, including the Department of the Platte and the Department of Dakota.  From January 1889 through July 1891 he served as adjutant general at the division level in the Division of the Pacific and the Division of the Atlantic.

In December 1892 he returned to the Adjutant General's Department in Washington, and he was elevated to Adjutant General of the U. S. Army with the rank of brigadier general in November 1893.  He retired in September 1897.  In April 1898, he was appointed governor of the Soldiers' Home in Washington, D.C., where he served until January 1903.  He died in October 1904, and was buried at Arlington National Cemetery.

Family
In 1868, Ruggles married Alma Hammond L'Hommedieu (1843-1921). They were the parents of four children, including Colden, Charles, Alma, and Francis.

References

Sources

External links

1833 births
1904 deaths
Adjutants general of the United States Army
Burials at Arlington National Cemetery
People from Newburgh, New York
People of New York (state) in the American Civil War
Union Army officers
United States Army generals
United States Military Academy alumni